is a passenger railway station in located in the city of  Hirakata, Osaka Prefecture, Japan, operated by the private railway company Keihan Electric Railway.

Lines
Kōzenji Station is served by the  Keihan Main Line, and is located 19.1 km from the starting point of the line at Yodoyabashi Station.

Station layout
The station has two ground-level opposed side platforms connected by an elevated station building.

Platforms

Adjacent stations

History
The station was opened on 15 December 1910.

Future plans 
The facilities are expected to be moved to a new elevated station by 2028. Construction has been in progress since September 2022.

Passenger statistics
In fiscal 2019, the station was used by an average of 21,799 passengers daily.

Surrounding area
Kozenji Temple
Hirakata Municipal Sada Junior High School Lifelong Learning Center
Hirakata Municipal Library
Yoshida Hospital (7 minutes walk)

See also 
List of railway stations in Japan

References

External links

Official home page 

Railway stations in Osaka Prefecture
Railway stations in Japan opened in 1910
Hirakata, Osaka

]